Ready Set Roll is an EP by American country music artist Chase Rice. It was released on October 15, 2013 via Dack Janiels Records.

Critical reception
Matt Bjorke of Roughstock rated the EP 4 out of 5 stars, saying that it is "a strong collection of songs that showcases an artist who is very much of the moment with quite a few of these songs but he also proves that he is more than just the ‘ditties’ that cover trucks, parties and moonlight rides." Giving it 2.5 out of 5, Stephen Thomas Erlewine of Allmusic wrote that "he's such a bro next door that he doesn't cut an impression, not even with songs that purposefully hit all the marks."

Track listing

Personnel
Nick Buda – drums
Scott Cooke – bass guitar, drum loop, electric guitar, programming, synthesizer
Chris DeStefano – bass guitar, drums, acoustic guitar, electric guitar, mandolin, pedal steel guitar, programming
Colt Ford – vocals on "Party Up"
Shannon Forrest – drums
Wes Hightower – background vocals
Charlie Judge – Hammond B-3 organ, piano, strings, synthesizer 
Rob McNelley – electric guitar
Russ Pahl – pedal steel guitar
Chase Rice – lead vocals
Darren Savard – acoustic guitar, electric guitar
Ilya Toshinsky – banjo, 12-string guitar, acoustic guitar, baritone guitar, electric guitar, mandolin, slide guitar

Chart performance

Weekly charts

Year-end charts

References

2013 EPs
Chase Rice EPs